Elizabeth Brenda "Liddy" Holloway (27 March 1947 – 29 December 2004) was a New Zealand actress and television scriptwriter.

Career
Born in Wellington, New Zealand, the daughter of a politician, Phil Holloway, Liddy Holloway originally worked as a journalist. She switched to acting and had a long career in the theatre. She also acted in Australia in the early 1980s, with acting roles in feature films Squizzy Taylor and The Clinic. She also acted on Australian television, appearing in guest roles in several episodes of soap opera Prisoner, a series for which she also wrote some scripts.

Holloway moved to Los Angeles briefly in 1990 to give Hollywood a try, but did not stay long. She eventually garnered international attention for her recurring role as Hercules' mother on the syndicated adventure series, Hercules: The Legendary Journeys, a role she played intermittently from 1995 to 1998.

Holloway also found wide recognition in her home country through her 1992–1998 lead role of Alex McKenna in the popular soap opera Shortland Street. Holloway was also a writer for the series, and for other television series such as Shark in the Park.

Holloway was the first person to champion making the book The Whale Rider into a feature film. She fought with the Film Commission because she wanted a writing credit for her work on the 2002 feature.

In 2002 Holloway portrayed Dorthy Moxley, mother of murder victim Martha Moxley, in the American television movie Murder in Greenwich, which, although set in Connecticut, was filmed in New Zealand.

Death
On 29 December 2004, Liddy Holloway died, aged 57, from liver cancer. She was survived by three children, Francesca Holibar, Mark Harlen, and actor/musician Joel Tobeck, who appeared with her on Shortland Street.

Filmography

Film

Television

References

External links
 
 Shortland Street interview

1945 births
2004 deaths
20th-century New Zealand women writers
20th-century New Zealand writers
Australian soap opera writers
Australian television actresses
Australian women screenwriters
Deaths from cancer in New Zealand
Deaths from liver cancer
New Zealand film actresses
New Zealand television actresses
People from Auckland
Actresses from Wellington City
Women soap opera writers
New Zealand soap opera actresses
20th-century Australian screenwriters
20th-century New Zealand journalists
20th-century Australian women